The Chile national badminton team represents Chile in international badminton team competitions. The Chilean team is managed by the Chile Badminton Federation. Chile competed in the 1997 Sudirman Cup. The team also competed in the Pan American Badminton Championships mixed team event from 2008 to 2016.

The Chilean mixed team also competes in the South American Games. They won bronze at the 2018 South American Games in Cochabamba, Bolivia.

Participation in BWF competitions

Sudirman Cup

Participation in Pan American Badminton Championships

Mixed team

Participation in South American Games

Current squad 
The following players were selected to represent Chile at the 2018 South American Games.

Men
Cristian Araya
Iván León
Fernando Sanhueza

Women
Ashley Montre
Constanza Naranjo
Javiera Torres

References

Badminton
National badminton teams
Badminton in Chile